Intel Dynamic Acceleration (IDA) sometimes called Dynamic Acceleration Technology (DAT) is a technology created by Intel Corp. in certain multi-core Intel microprocessors. It increases the clock rate of a single core for every two cores above its base operating frequency if the other cores are idle. It is designed for single threaded programs to run faster on multi-core Intel microprocessors. Intel later released a version of IDA called enhanced Dynamic Acceleration Technology (eDAT) for its quad core processors that boosts the performance of 2 cores when only 2 cores are being utilized.

History
Intel Dynamic Acceleration was first released with the Core 2 Duo mobile processor line, as new microprocessor lines were released, Intel changed the technology and naming scheme slightly.

Dual Dynamic Acceleration
With the introduction of quad core processors, Intel modified IDA and released Dual Dynamic Acceleration (DDA).

Intel Turbo Boost

The later released Nehalem microarchitecture of Intel microprocessors made additional changes to the original IDA and released an improved version called Intel Turbo Boost.

See also
 Overclocking
 Dynamic frequency scaling

References 
 Intel Core 2 Quad Mobile Processors
 2008 paper in the Intel Technology Journal

Intel microprocessors
X86 architecture